The vestibular duct or scala vestibuli is a perilymph-filled cavity inside the cochlea of the inner ear that conducts sound vibrations to the cochlear duct.

It is separated from the cochlear duct by Reissner's membrane and extends from the vestibule of the ear to the helicotrema where it joins the tympanic duct.

Additional images

See also
Tympanic duct

References

internal websites
 Slide from University of Kansas
 Diagram at Indiana University – Purdue University Indianapolis
 Image at University of New England (United States)

Auditory system
Ear